Kirlian Camera can mean:

a device used for Kirlian photography
the electronic darkwave band Kirlian Camera